Stephen Richards may refer to:
 Stephen Richards (politician) (1820–1894), lawyer and politician from Ontario, Canada
 Stephen Richards (murderer) (1854–1879), American serial killer
 Stephen L Richards (1879–1959), American religious leader
 Sir Stephen Richards (judge) (born 1950), Lord Justice of Appeal
 Stephen Richards (author), British investigative journalist and author, who founded Mirage Publishing in 1998
 Stephen Richards (musician) (born 1977), vocalist and guitarist in the rock music group Taproot
 Stephen Richards (canoeist) (born 1965), New Zealand sprint canoer
 Stephen Richards (business executive) (born 1965)
 Stephen Richards, alternative stage name of Mark Stevens (actor) (1916–1994)

See also
 Steve Richards (born 1960), British television and radio presenter and newspaper political columnist
 Steve Richards (footballer) (born 1961), Scottish former footballer
 Steven Richards (born 1972), Australian racing driver, son of Jim Richards
 Stevie Richards (born 1971), ring name of the American wrestler Michael Manna